Edward Carlingford Waller (June 14, 1889 – August 20, 1977) was an American stage, film and television actor.

Early years
Born in Chippewa Falls, Wisconsin, he was a son of the Rev. Thomas M. Waller, a Presbyterian minister, and Anna Taylor Waller, his wife; his parents were originally from England. Eddy Waller's involvement with dramatics began when he was a student at the University of Wisconsin.

Career

Stage
Waller performed in vaudeville and the legitimate theater before he entered films in Hollywood. His professional stage debut came in Chicago, Illinois. An item published in The Indianapolis News May 3, 1923, reported, "He has had several years' experience as leading man and also as director, and produces the Grand Players' plays as well as taking the leading roles." Waller became noted for his character impersonations of elderly men on stage and screen.

Film
Waller appeared in more than 250 sound films between 1929 and 1963 (Thomas M. Feramisco, in his book, The Mummy Unwrapped: Scenes Left on Universal's Cutting Room, has Waller "making the move to celluloid in 1936."), including 116 westerns and six serials. In 1955 Waller appeared as "Old Larky" (under the name credit Eddy C. Waller) in the film Foxfire starring Jane Russell and Jeff Chandler. He is best remembered as Nugget Clark, the sidekick in many films starring Allan 'Rocky' Lane between 1947 and 1953.

Television
In 1955, Waller became Rusty Lee, the saddle partner to actor Douglas Kennedy in the short-lived television series, Steve Donovan, Western Marshal. After that, he appeared in several A-westerns and television programs and was a semi-regular as Mose Shell, the dedicated stagecoach driver, in nineteen episodes of the NBC western series, Laramie, with John Smith and Robert Fuller.

Waller had a supporting role in the 1957-1958 syndicated series, Casey Jones starring Alan Hale, Jr. Waller played "Red Rock", the train conductor of Casey's Cannonball Express. He also played John Finney in the 1960-1961 miniseries Daniel Boone, which ran as part of Walt Disney Presents.

Death
Waller died of a stroke in Los Angeles, California, at the age of eighty-eight. He was buried in Forest Lawn Memorial Park (Hollywood Hills). His wife of forty-nine years of marriage, Doris M. Waller (1902-1977), had died in January 1977.

Selected filmography

Films

 The Mind Reader (1933) - Chauffeur (uncredited)
 One Way Ticket (1935) - George the Clerk (uncredited)
 Silver Spurs (1936) - Old-Timer (uncredited)
 Poppy (1936) - Bit part (uncredited)
 Rhythm on the Range (1936) - Field Judge (uncredited)
 Meet Nero Wolfe (1936) - Golf Starter
 The Public Pays (1936, Short) - The Association's Landlord (uncredited)
 Banjo on My Knee (1936) - Truck Driver (uncredited)
 On the Avenue (1937) - Shooting Gallery Attendant (uncredited)
 Secret Agent X-9 (1937, Serial) - Lawyer Carp [Chs. 2, 12] (uncredited)
 Sweetheart of the Navy (1937) - Krump
 Wild and Woolly (1937) - Fireman (uncredited)
 The Big Shot (1937) - Horace (uncredited)
 Small Town Boy (1937) - Sloane (uncredited)
 The Bad Man of Brimstone (1937) - Cassiius Bundy (uncredited)
 Call the Mesquiteers (1938) - Hardy
 State Police (1938) - Const. Higgins
 The Great Adventures of Wild Bill Hickok (1938, Serial) - Stone
 Flaming Frontiers (1938, Serial) - Andy Grant (Chs. 1–4)
 Strange Faces (1938) - Jeb, Mason City Obit Writer (uncredited)
 The Law West of Tombstone (1938) - Jenks, Martinez Postmaster (uncredited)
 Out West with the Hardys (1938) - 'Doc' Carson Hodge, a Veterinarian (uncredited)
 Stand Up and Fight (1939) - Conductor (uncredited)
 Jesse James (1939) - Deputy
 Rough Riders' Round-up (1939) - (uncredited)
 I'm from Missouri (1939)
 The Story of Alexander Graham Bell (1939) - Storekeeper (uncredited)
 The Return of the Cisco Kid (1939) - Guard on Stagecoach
 Young Mr. Lincoln (1939) - Father (scenes deleted)
 Mutiny on the Blackhawk (1939) - Parson
 New Frontier (1939) - Maj. Steven Braddock
 Konga, the Wild Stallion (1939) - Gloomy
 Two Bright Boys (1939) - Sheriff
 Legion of Lost Flyers (1939) - Petey
 Allegheny Uprising (1939) - Jailer
 Geronimo (1939) - Private (uncredited)
 Man from Montreal (1939) - Old Jacques
 The Cisco Kid and the Lady (1939) - Second Stage Driver (uncredited)
 Legion of the Lawless (1940) - Lafe Barton
 The Blue Bird (1940) - Birch Tree (uncredited)
 The Grapes of Wrath (1940) - Proprietor
 Viva Cisco Kid (1940) - Stagecoach Driver (uncredited)
 Enemy Agent (1940) - Cellmate (uncredited)
 20 Mule Team (1940) - Horsecollar, the Bartender (uncredited)
 Love, Honor and Oh-Baby! (1940) - Panhandler
 You're Not So Tough (1940) - Griswold
 Stagecoach War (1940) - Quince Cobalt
 Carolina Moon (1940) - Colonel Stanhope
 Gold Rush Maisie (1940) - Ben Hartley
 Girl from Avenue A (1940) - Groom (uncredited)
 Brigham Young (1940) - Man with California Gold News (uncredited)
 Boom Town (1940) - Hotel Clerk (uncredited)
 The Howards of Virginia (1940) - Patriot Scout (uncredited)
 The Devil's Pipeline (1940) - Benedict
 Youth Will Be Served (1940) - First Prisoner (uncredited)
 Texas Terrors (1940) - Judge Charles Bennett
 Santa Fe Trail (1940) - Workman (uncredited)
 Western Union (1941) - Stagecoach Driver #1 (uncredited)
 Scattergood Baines (1941) - Townsman (uncredited)
 Nice Girl? (1941) - Farmer (uncredited)
 Double Date (1941) - Truck Driver
 In Old Colorado (1941) - Jim Stark
 Hands Across the Rockies (1941) - Judge Plunkett
 Sergeant York (1941) - Man at Church (uncredited)
 The Son of Davy Crockett (1941) - Grandpa Mathews
 Bad Men of Missouri (1941) - Wagon Train Leader (uncredited)
 Six-Gun Gold (1941) - Ben Blanchard
 Honky Tonk (1941) - Fred - Train Conductor #2 (uncredited)
 The Bandit Trail (1941) - Tom Haggerty
 Public Enemies (1941) - Olaf
 Road Agent (1941) - Lewis (Rancher)
 Don't Get Personal (1942) - Slim
 Wild Bill Hickok Rides (1942) - Settler (uncredited)
 Shut My Big Mouth (1942) - Happy (uncredited)
 The Lone Star Ranger (1942) - Mitchell
 Klondike Fury (1942) - Blindy (uncredited)
 Sundown Jim (1942) - Clem Black
 Junior G-Men of the Air (1942, Serial) - Jed Holden [Chs. 1, 3, 5-6] (uncredited)
 My Gal Sal (1942) - Buggy Driver (uncredited)
 Juke Girl (1942) - Motorist Buying 6 Cents of Gas (uncredited)
 Wings for the Eagle (1942) - Customer Offered Pie (uncredited)
 A-Haunting We Will Go (1942) - Wilcox, Baggage Man (uncredited)
 Call of the Canyon (1942) - Dave Crosby (uncredited)
 Sin Town (1942) - Forager (uncredited)
 Night Monster (1942) - Jed Harmon
 The Mummy's Tomb (1942) - Police Scientist (uncredited)
 Scattergood Survives a Murder (1942) - Lafe Allen
 Cinderella Swings It (1943) - Lem
 Something to Shout About (1943) - George Priam - Concert Attendee (uncredited)
 Hangmen Also Die! (1943) - Hansom Cab Driver (uncredited)
 A Stranger in Town (1943) - Man in Barbershop (uncredited)
 Frontier Badmen (1943) - Auctioneer (uncredited)
 Silver Spurs (1943) - Davis (uncredited)
 Destroyer (1943) - Riveter (uncredited)
 A Lady Takes a Chance (1943) - Bus Station Attendant
 Headin' for God's Country (1943) - Hank
 The Kansan (1943) - Ed Gilbert
 Always a Bridesmaid (1943) - Justice Peters
 Sweet Rosie O'Grady (1943) - Shopkeeper (uncredited)
 My Kingdom for a Cook (1943) - Sam Thornton
 Ladies Courageous (1944) - Workman (uncredited)
 Up in Arms (1944) - Milkman (uncredited)
 Rationing (1944) - Smith (uncredited)
 The Adventures of Mark Twain (1944) - Southerner (uncredited)
 Man from Frisco (1944) - Older Worker (uncredited)
 Home in Indiana (1944) - Bill (uncredited)
 The Mummy's Ghost (1944) - Ben Evans (uncredited)
 Raiders of Ghost City (1944) - Doc Blair
 Barbary Coast Gent (1944) - Chad Jenkins - Second Stage Driver (uncredited)
 Tall in the Saddle (1944) - Santa Inez Depot Master (uncredited)
 An American Romance (1944) - Sheriff of Oak Hills (uncredited)
 Mystery of the River Boat (1944, Serial) - Charles Langtry
 Belle of the Yukon (1944) - Lynch Mob Member with Rope (uncredited)
 Under Western Skies (1945) - Preacher (uncredited)
 The Man Who Walked Alone (1945) - Farmer
 The Affairs of Susan (1945) - Grumpy Man at Bright Dollar (uncredited)
 The Missing Corpse (1945) - Desmond
 River Gang (1945) - Mr. Fish (uncredited)
 Rough Riders of Cheyenne (1945) - Andy Carson
 Dakota (1945) - Stagecoach Driver
 San Antonio (1945) - Cattleman (uncredited)
 Abilene Town (1946) - Hannaberry
 Because of Him (1946) - Gubbins (uncredited)
 Little Giant (1946) - Driver at Air-Pump (scenes deleted)
 Sun Valley Cyclone (1946) - Major Harding
 In Old Sacramento (1946) - Wagon Driver (uncredited)
 Renegades (1946) - Davy Lane (uncredited)
 Lover Come Back (1946) - Mr. Russell (uncredited)
 Avalanche (1946) - Sam
 Rendezvous with Annie (1946) - Civil War Veteran (uncredited)
 Sing While You Dance (1946) - Lem Aubrey
 Rustlers Round-Up (1946) - Tom Fremont
 Singing on the Trail (1946) - Lem
 Plainsman and the Lady (1946) - Fred Willats (uncredited)
 Magnificent Doll (1946) - Arthur (uncredited)
 Boston Blackie and the Law (1946) - Locksmith (uncredited)
 A Boy and His Dog (1946, Short) - Sheriff Kelly
 The Beginning or the End (1947) - Man (uncredited)
 The Michigan Kid (1947) - Post Office Clerk (uncredited)
 The Sea of Grass (1947) - Homesteader (uncredited)
 Pursued (1947) - Ben McComber (uncredited)
 The Millerson Case (1947) - Jeremiah Dobbs (uncredited)
 Sport of Kings (1947) - Perkins (uncredited)
 Wyoming (1947) - Drifter (uncredited)
 The Secret Life of Walter Mitty (1947) - Old Mariner (uncredited)
 Wild Harvest (1947) - Mr. Hatfield (uncredited)
 The Wild Frontier (1947) - Nugget Clark
 Magic Town (1947) - New Citizen in Crowd (uncredited)
 Nightmare Alley (1947) - Farmer Friend of J.E. Giles (uncredited)
 Louisiana (1947) - Mr. Davis
 Dangerous Years (1947) - Jock Nealy (uncredited)
 Bandits of Dark Canyon (1947) - Nugget Clark
 Secret Beyond the Door (1947) - Lem (uncredited)
 The Wreck of the Hesperus (1948) - Turnkey
 Black Bart (1948) - Ed Mason
 Oklahoma Badlands (1948) - Nugget Clark
 The Return of the Whistler (1948) - Sam the Estate Caretaker (uncredited)
 Adventures in Silverado (1948) - Will Thatcher
 The Bold Frontiersman (1948) - Sheriff Nugget Clark
 Carson City Raiders (1948) - Nugget Clark
 Speed to Spare (1948) - Charlie Blane, Explosives Driver (uncredited)
 River Lady (1948) - Hewitt
 Marshal of Amarillo (1948) - Nugget Clark
 The Arkansas Swing (1948) - Boggs
 The Strawberry Roan (1948) - Steve
 Desperadoes of Dodge City (1948) - Nugget Clark
 The Denver Kid (1948) - Nugget Clark
 The Girl from Manhattan (1948) - Jim Allison
 The Return of October (1948) - Stableman (uncredited)
 Sundown in Santa Fe (1948) - Horace Harvey 'Nugget' Clark
 Renegades of Sonora (1948) - Nugget Clark
 Whispering Smith (1948) - Conductor
 Sheriff of Wichita (1949) - Nugget Clark
 Death Valley Gunfighter (1949) - Nugget Clark
 Ma and Pa Kettle (1949) - Mr. Green (uncredited)
 Frontier Investigator (1949) - Nugget Clark
 Lust for Gold (1949) - Coroner (uncredited)
 Massacre River (1949) - Joe
 The Wyoming Bandit (1949) - Nugget Clark
 Bandit King of Texas (1949) - Nugget Clark
 Navajo Trail Raiders (1949) - Nugget Clark
 Powder River Rustlers (1949) - Nugget Clark
 The Traveling Saleswoman (1950) - Mr. Owen (uncredited)
 Gunmen of Abilene (1950) - Sheriff Nugget Clark
 Father Is a Bachelor (1950) - White (uncredited)
 Code of the Silver Sage (1950) - Nugget Clark
 Salt Lake Raiders (1950) - Nugget Clark
 Curtain Call at Cactus Creek (1950) - Jailer (uncredited)
 Covered Wagon Raid (1950) - Nugget Clark
 The Furies (1950) - Old Man (uncredited)
 Vigilante Hideout (1950) - Nugget Clark
 Frisco Tornado (1950) - Nugget Clark
 Woman on the Run (1950) - Storekeeper (uncredited)
 Rustlers on Horseback (1950) - Nugget Clark
 He's a Cockeyed Wonder (1950) - Pops Dunlap (uncredited)
 Mrs. O'Malley and Mr. Malone (1950) - Rigger (uncredited)
 California Passage (1950) - Waiter
 Cavalry Scout (1951) - General William Sherman
 Indian Uprising (1952) - Sagebrush
 Leadville Gunslinger (1952) - Nugget Clark
 Black Hills Ambush (1952) - Nugget Clark
 Montana Territory (1952) - Possum Enoch
 Thundering Caravans (1952) - Sheriff Nugget Clark
 Desperadoes' Outpost (1952) - Nugget Clark
 Marshal of Cedar Rock (1953) - Nugget Clark
 It Happens Every Thursday (1953) - James Bartlett
 Savage Frontier (1953) - Nugget Clark
 Powder River (1953) - Stable Owner (uncredited)
 The Last Posse (1953) - Dr. Pryor
 Bandits of the West (1953) - Nugget Clark
 Champ for a Day (1953) - Phil
 99 River Street (1953) - Pop Durkee
 El Paso Stampede (1953) - Nugget Clark
 Make Haste to Live (1954) - 'Spud' Kelly
 The Far Country (1954) - Yukon Sam (uncredited)
 The Man from Laramie (1955) - Dr. Selden (uncredited)
 Man Without a Star (1955) - Tom Cassidy
 Foxfire (1955) - Old Larky
 The Night Runner (1957) - Vernon
 The Phantom Stagecoach (1957) - Sam Clayton (uncredited)
 The Restless Breed (1957) - Caesar
 Day of the Badman (1958) - Mr. Slocum
 Lassie: A Christmas Tail (1963) - Matt Krebs

Television series

Ford Theatre (1952–1955) - Station Master / Clam-digger / Courtney
The Lone Ranger (1953–1955) - Hardrock Hazen / Haskell / Jules
The Cisco Kid (1954) - Dr. Bender / Eli Oliver
Letter to Loretta (1954) - Joe Rogan
Four Star Playhouse (1955) - Andy
Steve Donovan, Western Marshal (1955–1956, supporting role) - Deputy Marshal Rusty Lee
Fury (1956, episode "Tungsten Queen") - Hank Enos
Broken Arrow (1957) - Hank Thompson
Casey Jones (1957–1958, supporting role) - Red Rock Smith / Red Rock
Wagon Train (1958, in "The Jennifer Churchill Story") - Ned
The Texan, 2 episodes (1959) - Stage Driver / Oldest Rider
The Life and Legend of Wyatt Earp as Rawhide Geraghty in "The Truth About Rawhide Geraghty" (1959); Hugh O'Brian as Wyatt Earp rides shotgun for the retiring 69-year-old Wells Fargo stagecoach driver Rawhide Geraghty on his last run from Tucumcari, New Mexico Territory, to Amarillo, Texas. The trip is hazardous with bandits and hostile Apache, and Rawhide is apprehensive about what he and Earp will face. - Rawhide Geraghty
Man Without a Gun (1959, in "The Giant")
Wanted: Dead or Alive (1959, "The Empty Cell") - Pop Cole
Tales of Wells Fargo (1959–1961, 2 episodes) - Grandpa Charlie Bridger / Pat Rankin
Overland Trail (1960) in episode 2: "The O'Mara Ladies"
Pony Express (1960, in "The Search") - Nate
Shotgun Slade (1960, in "The Missing Dog") - the Sheriff
Outlaws (1961, in "Roly") - Forsythe
Laramie (1959–1963, recurring role) - Mose / Mose - Stage Driver / Mose Shell
Disneyland (1960–1962) - Captain Swain / John Finley / Linc
Bonanza (1962, in "The First Born") - Harry
Dr. Kildare (1962) - Dr. Millard Eakins
Empire (1962 in "The Earth Mover") - Abel Saunders
Lassie (1960-1963, 8 episodes) - Matt Krebbs / Henry Enders / Jonathan Grigsby

References

External links

1889 births
1977 deaths
20th-century American male actors
Male actors from Wisconsin
American male stage actors
American male film actors
American male television actors
Vaudeville performers
People from Chippewa Falls, Wisconsin
Male actors from Los Angeles
Burials at Forest Lawn Memorial Park (Hollywood Hills)
University of Wisconsin–Madison alumni